Ramat Yishai (Jesse's Heights) is a town in the Northern District of Israel, located on the side of the Haifa–Nazareth road about  eastern to Kiryat Tivon. It was previously called Jaida  and was inhabited by Arabs. It achieved local council status in 1958.

History
Archaeological remnants have been found from Middle Bronze Age I (a tomb) and the Roman,  Byzantine,   Umayyad and Abbasid  eras.  Of particular interest, was a  zoomorphic vessel of glass, dating to the Umayyad era. Remains from the  Crusades, as well as from the  Mamluk era has  also been found here.

Ottoman era
During the Ottoman era, a Muslim village called Jeida existed here.

The village appeared as Geida  on the map which  Pierre Jacotin compiled in 1799.

In 1859, the village of Jeida  was estimated to have 120 inhabitants, and the tillage was 20 feddans. In 1875 Victor Guérin found  rock-cut cisterns here.  In 1881, the PEF's Survey of Western Palestine (SWP)  found that Jeida  was much like Al-Harithiyah, but with houses of adobe. A spring existed 3/4 of a mile to the west.

A population list from about 1887 showed that Jeida had about 140  inhabitants; all Muslims.

One of the better known buildings in the village is called "the Khan" (caravanserai in Arabic), a 1909 building with surrounding walls. The logo of the village consists of this Ottoman-era building with a palm tree next to it.  The town hall flies 2 logo-on-bedsheet flags with this emblem in dark blue on a light blue and a yellow field, respectively.

British Mandate era
In the 1922 census of Palestine conducted by the British Mandate authorities,  Jaida had  a total population of  327;  324 Muslims and 3 Christians; of which two were Roman Catholics and one was Melkite Catholic.

Ramat Yishai was founded in 1925 when a Zionist organisation purchased  15,000 dunams in Jaida, including the Khan building, from the heirs of the Twsiny family (partners of the  Sursuk family of Beirut.)  At the time, there were 110 families living in the village.

At the time of the 1931 census, Jaida  had 29 occupied houses and a population of 77 Jews, 2 Christians, and 33 Muslims; a total of 115.

The land, on the western edge of the Jezreel Valley, which belonged to the village of Jida, was bought by a group of American Zionists in the early 1920s. It was renamed Manor and then Yefe Nof, but was almost deserted after a few years. In 1925, the British philanthropist Yisrael Yehudah "Yishai" Adler saved it from bankruptcy and it was renamed in his honour shortly thereafter. Among the founders of the village were 50 Polish Jewish immigrant families from Łódź and Białystok, who built a textile factory in the village. Yemenite Jews were also among the first residents. They were later joined by Jewish refugees from Romania.

During the Arab Revolt the isolated Jewish population was subject to constant attacks, sniper fire and ambushes from armed militias of local Arabs. On 12 October 1936 Mordechai Feldman was ambushed and killed. On the night of 5 June 1938, armed Arabs attacked the Jews in the village, killed one of the volunteer notrim, Zvi Levine, wounded another, and burned down the textile factory.

The population in mid-1937 was estimated as 43 non-Jews and 35 Jews. In the  1945 statistics, Ramat Yishai had 50 residents, all Jewish. It was noted that it was previously called Jeida.

State of Israel
Since the 1990s, Ramat Yishai has undergone rapid development. In 2010, the population was estimated at close to 7,000 people, with 1,800 households at the high end of the socioeconomic scale.

Notable residents
Tzahi Elihen
Itay Shechter, footballer

References

Bibliography

External links
Ramat Yishai Official website
Ramat Yishai on Galil-Net
  Jida, from Dr. Moslih Kanaaneh
Survey of Western Palestine, Map 5:    IAA, Wikimedia commons

Populated places established in 1925
Local councils in Northern District (Israel)
1925 establishments in Mandatory Palestine